Biathlon at the 2019 European Youth Olympic Winter Festival was held from 12 to 15 February at Nordic ski center Dvorišta, Pale, Bosnia and Herzegovina.

Competition schedule

Medal summary

Medal table

Boys' events

Girls' events

Team event

References 

European Youth Olympic Winter Festival
2019 European Youth Olympic Winter Festival events
2019